Benjamin Franklin Leiter (October 13, 1813 – June 17, 1866) was a nineteenth-century politician, lawyer, teacher and justice of the peace from Ohio. He served two terms in the United States House of Representatives from 1855 to 1859.

Biography 
Born in Leitersburg, Maryland, Leiter received a limited schooling as a child. He taught school in Maryland from 1830 to 1834 before moving to Ohio where he continued teaching from 1834 to 1842. He studied law at the office of David A. Starkweather. He was admitted to the bar in 1842, commencing practice in Canton, Ohio. Leiter was a justice of the peace and mayor of Canton for ten years. He was a member of the Ohio House of Representatives in 1848 and 1849, serving as Speaker of the House in the latter year. Leiter was elected an Oppositionist and later Republican to the United States House of Representatives in 1854, serving from 1855 to 1859. He died in Canton, Ohio, on June 17, 1866, and was interred in Canton in West Lawn Cemetery.

In 1836, Leiter married Catherine Burger of Canton. They had seven children. He was a Lutheran.

References

External links

1813 births
1866 deaths
People from Washington County, Maryland
American Lutherans
Opposition Party members of the United States House of Representatives from Ohio
Speakers of the Ohio House of Representatives
Mayors of places in Ohio
Ohio lawyers
Politicians from Canton, Ohio
Burials at West Lawn Cemetery
19th-century American politicians
Lawyers from Canton, Ohio
Republican Party members of the Ohio House of Representatives
19th-century American lawyers
19th-century Lutherans
Republican Party members of the United States House of Representatives from Ohio